The 2015 ICF Canoe Slalom World Championships were the 37th edition of the ICF Canoe Slalom World Championships. The event took place from 15 to 20 September 2015 in London, United Kingdom, under the auspices of International Canoe Federation (ICF), at the Lee Valley White Water Centre facility, which was also the venue for the canoe slalom events at the 2012 Summer Olympics.

The London bid was selected by the ICF Board of Directors on April 15, 2011 in Paris. London defeated Bourg St.-Maurice in the bidding process.

The event was the only global qualification for the 2016 Summer Olympics in Rio de Janeiro.

Schedule
The schedule of events. All times listed are (UTC+1).

Medal summary

Medal table

Men

Canoe

Kayak

Women

Canoe

Kayak

References

External links
Official website

2015
World Canoe Slalom Championships
World Canoe Slalom Championships
World Canoe Slalom Championships
2015 World Canoe Slalom Championships
Canoeing in England
Canoeing and kayaking competitions in the United Kingdom
World Canoe Slalom Championships